"'Can't Drive a Parked Car"' is a single by American rapper Gerald Walker from his upcoming compilation Ayo Volume 1. The song was released through  Blue Collar Gang and G. Walker Music LLC on December 7, 2019.

Background
According to Vibe magazine in December 2019 Walker launched a new business venture, Ayọ Fragrance + Design Studios. The song will be featured on the companies forthcoming compilation.

References

2019 singles
Gerald Walker songs
2019 songs